Haakon Hasberg Breien (8 July 1864 – 21 October 1942) was a Norwegian judge.

He was born in Jevnaker to Michael Hammer Breien and Johanne Borch. He graduated as cand.jur. in 1885, and was named as a Supreme Court Justice from 1921.

References

1864 births
1942 deaths
People from Jevnaker
Supreme Court of Norway justices